Journalism Studies is a bimonthly peer-reviewed academic journal covering communication studies as it pertains to journalism. It was established in 2000 by Bob Franklin (Cardiff University), who served as its editor-in-chief until stepping down in 2018. It is published by Routledge on behalf of the European Journalism Training Association, the European Communication Research and Education Association and the Journalism Studies Division of the International Communication Association. The current editor-in-chief is Folker Hanusch (University of Vienna). According to the Journal Citation Reports, the journal has a 2020 impact factor of 3.741.

References

External links

Journalism journals
Routledge academic journals
Bimonthly journals
Publications established in 2000
English-language journals
Academic journals associated with international learned and professional societies of Europe